Thorsten Quaeschning (born 23 February 1977) is a German musician. He is the bandleader of the electronic music group Tangerine Dream which he joined in 2005. He performs synthesizers, vocals, guitar and drums.

Early life 
Quaeschning was born in 1977 in Berlin within a classically trained music-loving family.

As a child, he learned violin, piano, drums and flute and was drawn to classical composers such as Engelbert Humperdinck, Wagner, Telemann, Smetana and Mozart.

Career 

Before joining Tangerine Dream, Quaeschning worked as a producer for the band Minory. Afterwards, he began to tour with Tangerine Dream behind the scenes in 2003 before joining them two years later.

Quaeschning has a second band called Picture Palace music.

In 2018, Quaeschning released the soundtrack to the thriller film Cargo.

Discography

Solo 
The Seaside Stage Session (2019)
The Munich Session (2019)
Autokino Session (2020)
The Capitol Session (2020)
Ballhaus Session (2020)

Ama (2021)

with Ulrich Schnauss 
Synthwaves (2017)

with Picture Palace Music 
Nostalgia (2006)
Somnambulistic Tunes (2007) (recorded 2004)
Symphony for Vampires (2008)
Natatorium (2009)
Cargo (2018)

References

External links 

Ambient musicians
Living people
1970s births
German drummers
German electronic musicians
German film score composers
German  male  guitarists
German keyboardists
Tangerine Dream members
21st-century German  male singers
21st-century guitarists
21st-century drummers